Cristopher Crisostomo Mercedes (born March 8, 1994) is a Dominican professional baseball starting pitcher for the Chiba Lotte Marines of Nippon Professional Baseball (NPB). He was signed by the Tampa Bay Rays as an international free agent in 2011. He is a switch hitter.

Career

Tampa Bay Rays
On July 2, 2011, Mercedes signed with the Tampa Bay Rays organization as an international free agent. He made his professional debut with the Dominican Summer League Rays in 2012, posting a 1-3 record and 3.66 ERA in 14 games. He split the 2013 season between the DSL Rays and the rookie-level GCL Rays, pitching to a cumulative 2-5 record and 3.83 ERA. He returned to the GCL Rays in 2014, pitching to a 1-2 record and 3.24 ERA with 11 strikeouts in 16.2 innings of work. For the 2015 season, Mercedes played for the Low-A Hudson Valley Renegades, recording a 2.85 ERA in 18 appearances. On October 8, 2015, Mercedes was released by the Rays organization.

Yomiuri Giants
On January 5, 2017, Mercedes signed with the Yomiuri Giants of Nippon Professional Baseball (NPB) as a developmental squad player. He spent the year with the Giants’ farm and team, recording a 3.29 ERA in 18 games.

On July 8, 2018, Mercedes was added to Yomiuri's main team roster. He made his NPB debut on July 10 as the starting pitcher against the Tokyo Yakult Swallows, and pitched 5.0 scoreless innings en route to the win. He finished his rookie season with a 5-4 record and 2.05 ERA in 13 games. For the 2019 season, Mercedes pitched in 22 games for Yomiuri, logging an 8-8 record and 3.52 ERA with 107 strikeouts in 138.1 innings of work. In 2020, Mercedes recorded a 4-4 record and 3.10 ERA in 11 appearances before his season ended after undergoing surgery to clean out his left elbow.

International career
On July 8, 2021, Mercedes was named to the Olympic roster for the Dominican Republic national baseball team for the 2020 Summer Olympics (contested in 2021). He started for the team in their opening game against Japan, giving up 1 earned run over 6 innings in a no-decision.

References

External links

 Career statistics - NPB.jp

1994 births
Living people
Baseball players at the 2020 Summer Olympics
Medalists at the 2020 Summer Olympics
Olympic medalists in baseball
Olympic bronze medalists for the Dominican Republic
Dominican Republic expatriate baseball players in Japan
Dominican Republic expatriate baseball players in the United States
Dominican Summer League Rays players
Gulf Coast Rays players
Hudson Valley Renegades players
Nippon Professional Baseball pitchers
Yomiuri Giants players
Chiba Lotte Marines players
People from La Romana, Dominican Republic
Olympic baseball players of the Dominican Republic